Dolores Jiménez Alcántara (28 July 1909, in La Puebla de Cazalla, Seville14 June 1999, Málaga), known as "Niña de la Puebla "(in Spanish: "The girl from La Puebla"; La Puebla is her birthplace) was one of the greatest flamenco and Andalusian copla singers.

Jimenez was born on 28 July 1909, the daughter of a barber. An eye infection at a young age resulted in blindness. At age 8 she moved with her family to Madrid and began music lessons and studied flamenco.

In 1931 Jimenez debuted in Seville. Her style was known as dulce, or sweet. She married another singer in 1934, Lucas Soto Martin, and had five children, two of whom became flamenco professionals.

References

1909 births
1999 deaths
Singers from Andalusia
Blind musicians
Spanish blind people
20th-century Spanish singers
20th-century Spanish women singers